Charles Kerremans (1847- 10 October 1915, Brussels) was a Belgian entomologist who specialised in Coleoptera, especially Buprestidae and Cicindelidae.

He was a Member of the Société entomologique de France.

Publications 
Partial list.
1893 Les Chrysobothrines d'Afrique Annales de la Société Entomologique de Belgique 37:232-260.
1896 Julodis atkinsoni. A new species of (Buprestid) Beetle  Indian Museum Notes 4:48-49.
1898 Descriptions de Buprestides nouveaux de Madagascar (Col.)'Bulletin de la Société Entomologique de France 1898:78-84.
1903 Coleoptera: Buprestidae.In: Wytsman P. Genera Insectorum XII.V. Verteneuil & L. Desmet, Bruxelles, 338 pp. & 4 pl.
1904 Faune Entomologique de l'Afrique Tropicale. Buprestidae  Ann. Mus. Congo, Zool. S. III, T. 3, fasc. 1
1909 Catalogue raisonne des Buprestides du Congo Belge Ann. Mus. Congo, Zool. S. III, sect. II, T. 1, fasc. 2
1906-1913  Monographie des Buprestides  Vol. I-VII – V. Dulan et Co., London.
1914 Troisième supplément au Catalogue des Buprestides du Congo Belge. Revue de Zoologique Africaine 3:347-364.
1914 Coleoptera, Buprestidae [of the Seychelles].  Transactions of the Linnean Society of London 16:377-378.
1914 Buprestidae. In: Dr. H. Schubotz (Ed.). Ergebnisse der Zweiten Deutschen Zentral-Afrika-Expedition 1910–1911 unter Führung Adolf Friedrichs, Herzogs zu Mecklenburg. Band I, Zoologie. Hamburgische Wissenschaftliche Stiftung, Leipzig, pp. 79–88.
1918 Coleoptera V: Buprestidae. In: Beiträge zur Kenntnis der Land-und Süßwasserfauna Deutsch Südwestafrikas. Volume 1, pp. 295–303.

His collections are shared between the Royal Museum for Central Africa, the Muséum national d'histoire naturelle and the Natural History Museum, London.

 References 
Bellamy, C. L. 1998 A bibliography of the scientific papers by Charles Kerremans. Arch. Nat. Hist''. 25(3) 321-329

External links 

Complete Kerremans Bibliography

1847 births
1915 deaths
Belgian entomologists
Coleopterists